Daniel D. Hutto is an American philosopher and professor of philosophical psychology jointly at the University of Wollongong and University of Hertfordshire.
He is known for his research on enactivism, affect, folk psychology and Ludwig Wittgenstein's philosophy. He is also known for designing and heading the degree of Western Civilisation at the University of Wollongong. This degree has led to controversy due to being funded by the Ramsay Centre, of which former prime ministers Toby Abbott and John Howard are board members.

See also
Space Infantry
embodied cognition

Bibliography
 Radicalizing Enactivism: Basic Minds without Content (with Myin, E.). Cambridge, MA: The MIT Press, Bradford Books. (2013)
 Folk Psychological Narratives: The Socio-Cultural Basis of Understanding Reasons. Cambridge, MA: The MIT Press, Bradford Books. (2008, paperback edition 2013)
 Wittgenstein and the End of Philosophy: Neither Theory Nor Therapy. Basingstoke: Palgrave. (2006, 2003). 1st edition (2003). Second, revised edition (2006) contains an additional chapter with replies to papers by Rupert Read (2004, 2006) and Phil Hutchinson and Rupert Read (2006)
 Daniel D. Hutto & Matthew Ratcliffe (eds.), Folk Psychology Re-Assessed; Dorndrecht, the Netherlands: Springer, 2007;

References

External links
 Hutto at the University of Wollongong

21st-century American philosophers
Academic staff of the University of Wollongong
Analytic philosophers
American expatriate academics
Living people
Philosophers of psychology
Alumni of the University of York
Alumni of the University of St Andrews
Marist College alumni
Academics of the University of Hertfordshire
Year of birth missing (living people)